Metachroma carolinense is a species of leaf beetle. It is found in the United States.

References

Further reading

 

Eumolpinae
Articles created by Qbugbot
Taxa named by Doris Holmes Blake
Beetles described in 1970
Beetles of the United States